The term Roman Europe may refer to:

 in general, European regions of the Roman Empire
 in particular, Roman province of Europe, created by emperor Diocletian

See also
 Europe (disambiguation)
 Roman Africa (disambiguation)
 Roman Orient (disambiguation)